Eveline de Haan (born 21 February 1976) is a Dutch field hockey player who played for HC Klein Zwitserland and NMHC Nijmegen. De Haan was a member of the Holland squad that became world champions at the 2006 Women's Hockey World Cup. She earned a total number of 30 caps for the national team.

References

External links
KNHB site

1976 births
Living people
Dutch female field hockey players
Dutch field hockey coaches
Female field hockey goalkeepers
Sportspeople from Nijmegen
HC Klein Zwitserland players
NMHC Nijmegen players
20th-century Dutch women
21st-century Dutch women